Ohio's 8th senatorial district has been based in Cincinnati, Ohio and currently comprises the western portion of Hamilton County.  It encompasses Ohio House districts 28, 29 and 30. It has a Cook PVI of R+14.  The district was represented by the Senate President from 1989 to 1996 with Senator Stanley Aronoff.  Its current Ohio Senator is Republican Louis Blessing. He resides in Cincinnati, a city located in Hamilton County.

List of senators

References

External links
Ohio's 8th district senator at the 130th Ohio General Assembly official website

Ohio State Senate districts